The Lion of Venice is an ancient bronze sculpture of a winged lion in the Piazza San Marco of Venice, Italy, which came to symbolize the city – as well as one of its patron saints, St Mark – after its arrival there in the 12th century. The sculpture surmounts one of two large granite columns in the Square, thought to have been erected between 1172 and 1177 during the reign of Doge Sebastiano Ziani or about 1268, bearing ancient symbols of the two patron saints of Venice.  

The Lion sculpture has had a very long and obscure history, probably starting its existence as a winged lion-griffin statue on a monument to the god Sandon at Tarsus in Cilicia  about 300 BC.  The figure, which stands on the eastern column, at some point came to represent the Lion of Saint Mark, traditional symbol of Saint Mark the evangelist.  The figure standing on the western column is St. Theodore of Amasea, patron of the city before St Mark, who holds a spear and stands on a crocodile (to represent the dragon which he was said to have slain). It is also made up of parts of antique statues and is a copy, the original being kept in the Doge's Palace.

Description
The Lion weighs approximately 3,000 kilograms. The book under its front paws is a later addition.

History

Origin
The Lion, in its present form, is a composite of different pieces of bronze created at very different times, building upon ancient "core" components.  It has undergone extensive restoration and repair work at various times.

Scholarship over the last 200 years variously attributed the provenance of the most ancient parts of the statue to Assyria, Sassania, Greco-Bactria, medieval Venice, and various other times and places. Scientific and art historical studies in the 1980s, however, led to the conclusion that it was created between the end of the 4th and the beginning of the 3rd centuries BC somewhere in the Hellenistic Greek or Oriental Greek world.  The original bronze figure, taken as a whole, was likely significantly different from the Lion of today; and, predating Christianity, would not have originally had any association with Saint Mark.

Medieval
It is likely that the statue was assembled into something like its present form by or during the Medieval period.  The earliest textual reference to the Lion is from 1293, when it is recorded as having been restored after long neglect.

Expatriation and repatriation

The Lion was taken to France after Napoleon's conquest of the Venetian Republic, during his 1797 campaign in Italy.  It was damaged in the course of removal and transport; lacking wings, paws, tail, and Gospel-book.  After being restored by French sculptors, possibly Edme Gaulle or Jean Guillaume Moitte, the Lion was mounted on a plinth in the new Fontaine des Invalides.  The fountain, completed in 1804, was located at the Place des Invalides, Paris.

After Napoleon's downfall the Lion was returned to Venice, now a part of the Austrian Empire.  On 2 October 1815, during the process of removal, it was again badly damaged.  A rope broke, the statue fell, and smashed apart; whether by accident, or in an act of sabotage by one of the French workers is unclear. As a result, the bronze figure was broken into approximately 20 pieces.  Having lost its main ornament, the Fontaine des Invalides was eventually redesigned, and finally demolished in 1840.

Repatriated to Venice, the fragments of the Lion were stored at the Arsenal before it was repaired by Bartolomeo Ferrari and returned to its column, officially, on 13 April 1816.  This restoration included an alteration to the Lion's tail, now extended, which had previously been tucked between its hind legs.  The book beneath its paws was again recast; the French replacement having been lost, stolen, or abandoned.

Scientific analysis

Iconography and Popular Culture
Ultimately, the image of the Lion appeared on the flag of the Venetian Republic, and it is also well known as Golden Lion in the form of the prizes introduced in 1949 at the Venice International Film Festival.

American comedian Conan O'Brien used the Lion of Venice in a joke when doing a travel show in Italy with producer Jordan Schlansky. In a lampoon of Italian Cinema, the statue is shown with a leg broken off and replaced with an arm from a Barbie doll, while the title card shows (in Italian) "Terribly Restored Statue Productions." The title card with the broken statue serves as introduction to "Due Buffoni" (Two Buffoons), a black and white mock-Italian movie showing Conan and Jordan's adventures in Italy while a depressed Italian narrator describes how awful the mock-film and its two subjects are.

See also

References
Includes material from the French Wikipedia article about the Fontaine des Invalides.

4th-century BC Greek sculptures
3rd-century BC Greek sculptures
Sculptures of lions
Hellenistic and Roman bronzes
Monuments and memorials in Venice
Outdoor sculptures in Venice
Hellenistic sculpture
Ancient Greek sculptures
Bronze sculptures in Venice
Statues in Italy
Piazza San Marco
Ancient Greek metalwork